The Sasscer Tobacco Barn is a historic tobacco barn in Brandywine, Maryland.

References

Buildings and structures in Prince George's County, Maryland
Landmarks in Maryland
Tobacco barns
Buildings and structures completed in 1917
Tobacco buildings in the United States
1917 establishments in Maryland